Dandenong South is a suburb in Melbourne, Victoria, Australia, 31 km south-east of Melbourne's Central Business District, located within the City of Greater Dandenong local government area.

Dandenong South is a primarily industrialised suburb that borders Hallam and the City of Casey region. The suburb contains the closed General Motors railway station.

Dandenong South is home to A Company of the Australian Army Reserve unit, 5th/6th Battalion, Royal Victoria Regiment and DefendTex.

See also
 City of Cranbourne – Parts of Dandenong South were previously within this former local government area.
 City of Dandenong – Parts of Dandenong South were previously within this former local government area.

References

Suburbs of Melbourne
Suburbs of the City of Greater Dandenong